The 2011–12 UMass Minutemen basketball team represented the University of Massachusetts Amherst during the 2011–12 NCAA Division I men's basketball season. The Minutemen, led by fourth year head coach Derek Kellogg, played their home games at William D. Mullins Memorial Center, with one home game played at Curry Hicks Cage, and are members of the Atlantic 10 Conference. They finished the season 25–12, 9–7 in A-10 play to finish in a four way tie for fifth place. They lost in the semifinals of the Atlantic 10 Basketball tournament to St. Bonaventure. They were invited to the 2012 National Invitation Tournament where they defeated Mississippi State, Seton Hall, and Drexel en route to the semifinals at Madison Square Garden where they fell to Stanford.

Roster

Schedule

|-
!colspan=9| Regular season

|-
!colspan=9| 2012 Atlantic 10 men's basketball tournament

|-
!colspan=9| 2012 NIT

References

UMass Minutemen basketball seasons
Umass
Umass